The Golf Game: Par Excellence is a board game published in 1985 by Challenge sprl.

Contents
The Golf Game: Par Excellence is a game in which each of the nine laminated maps of the greatest golf courses in the world represents a hole for the game.

Reception
Brian Walker reviewed The Golf Game: Par Excellence for Games International magazine, and gave it 3 stars out of 5, and stated that "This game should appeal to anyone with an interest in golf. If you've ever dreamed of teeing off at Cypress Point, California, now's your chance, for this is the next best thing."

References

Board games introduced in 1985